Stoyanov, feminine Stoyanova is a Bulgarian surname. Sometimes, when abroad, the spelling is changed, for instance, to Stoianov or Estoyanoff.

A migration of Jewish families with the name Stoyanov/Stoianov travelled through north out of Bulgaria. The 19th  century saw numerous Ashkenazic Jewish Stoyanov families hide in Russian Orthodoxy while remaining strictly observant within their own homes.

It may refer to:

Aleksandar Stoyanov (born 1986), Bulgarian footballer
Angel Stoyanov (ski jumper) (born 1958), Bulgarian ski jumper
Angel Stoyanov (boxer) (born 1967), Bulgarian boxer
Blagovest Stoyanov (born 1968), Bulgarian sprint canoer
Bogdan Stoyanov (born 1987), Bulgarian footballer
Borislav Stoyanov (born 1985), Bulgarian footballer
David Stoyanov (born 1991), Bulgarian footballer
Dimitar Stoyanov, better known as Radoy Ralin (1923–2004), Bulgarian dissident, poet, and satirist
Dimitar Stoyanov (politician) (born 1983), Bulgarian and EU politician
Emil Stoyanov (born 1959), Bulgarian politician
Fabián Estoyanoff (born 1982), Uruguayan footballer
Georgi Stoyanov (pentathlete)  (born 1947), Bulgarian modern pentathlete
Georgi Stoyanov (footballer) (born 1983), Bulgarian footballer
Hristo Stoyanov (born 1953), Bulgarian volleyball player
Ilian Stoyanov (born 1977), Bulgarian footballer
Ivan Stoyanov (footballer, born 1949) (born 1949), Bulgarian footballer
Ivan Stoyanov (athlete) (born 1969), Bulgarian long jumper
Ivan Stoyanov (footballer, born 1983) (born 1983), Bulgarian footballer
Ivan Stoyanov (footballer, born 1991) (born 1991), Bulgarian footballer
Ivaylo Stoyanov (born 1990), Bulgarian footballer
Kaloyan Stoyanov (born 1986), Bulgarian footballer
Kiro Stojanov (born 1959), Macedonian Greek-Catholic hierarch, Apostolic Exarch of Macedonia (since 2005)
Kostadin Stoyanov (born 1986), Bulgarian footballer
Krum Stoyanov (born 1992), Bulgarian footballer
Michael Stoyanov (born 1970), American actor and television writer
Nikola Stoyanov (1874–1967), Bulgarian scientist, economist and financier
Nikolai Stojanov (1883–1968), Bulgarian botanist
Paraskev Stoyanov (1871–1941), Bulgarian surgeon
Petar Stoyanov (born 1952), President of Bulgaria from 1997 until 2002
Petar Stoyanov (footballer) (born 1985), Bulgarian footballer
Petru Stoianov (born 1931), Romanian composer
Rachel Stoyanov (born 2003), Bulgarian rhythmic gymnast 
Rumen Stoyanov (born 1976), Bulgarian footballer
Stanislav Stoyanov (born 1976), Bulgarian footballer
Stoyan Stoyanov  (1913–1994), Bulgarian fighter ace of the Royal Bulgarian Air Force
Svetoslav Stoyanov (born 1976), Bulgarian/French badminton player
Todor Stoyanov (1930–1999), Bulgarian film director and cinematographer
Velcho Stoyanov (1907–1982), Bulgarian footballer
Veselin Stoyanov (1902–1969), Bulgarian composer
Vladimir Stoyanov (born 1969), Bulgarian operatic baritone
Vladislav Stoyanov (born 1987), Bulgarian footballer
Yuri Stoyanov (born 1957), Soviet and Russian theater and film actor, musician of Bulgarian descent
Zahari Stoyanov (1850–1889), Bulgarian revolutionary and historian

Stoyanova
Boriana Stoyanova (born 1969), Bulgarian artistic gymnast
Elena Stoyanova (born 1952), Bulgarian shot putter 
Krassimira Stoyanova (born 1962), Bulgarian soprano
Mariya Stoyanova (born 1947), Bulgarian basketball player
Penka Stoyanova (born 1950), Bulgarian basketball player
Radka Stoyanova (born 1964), Bulgarian rower

See also
Stojanov

Bulgarian-language surnames
Patronymic surnames
Surnames from given names